Hamadryas amphinome, the red cracker, is a species of cracker butterfly in the family Nymphalidae, native to regions of North and South America.

Distribution
It is found from Mexico, through the Caribbean and Central America, to the Amazon basin including in Brazil, Guianas, Peru, and Bolivia, and south into Argentina.

Subspecies
Subspecies of Hamadryas amphinome, listed alphabetically, include:
Hamadryas amphinome amphinome (Colombia, Bolivia, Brazil)
Hamadryas amphinome fumosa (Colombia)
Hamadryas amphinome mazai (Mexico)
Hamadryas amphinome mexicana (Mexico to Colombia)
Hamadryas amphinome mexicana (Costa Rica )
most abundant on the Pacific slope of Costa Rica

Food source
The larvae feed on Dalechampia scandens.

References

Hamadryas (butterfly)
Butterflies of North America
Butterflies of Central America
Butterflies of the Caribbean
Nymphalidae of South America
Butterflies of Cuba
Lepidoptera of Brazil
Lepidoptera of Venezuela
Arthropods of Argentina
Invertebrates of Bolivia
Lepidoptera of Colombia
Fauna of the Amazon
Butterflies described in 1767
Taxa named by Carl Linnaeus